In probability theory and statistics, the Conway–Maxwell–Poisson (CMP or COM–Poisson) distribution is a discrete probability distribution named after Richard W. Conway, William L. Maxwell, and Siméon Denis Poisson that generalizes the Poisson distribution by adding a parameter to model overdispersion and underdispersion. It is a member of the exponential family, has the Poisson distribution and geometric distribution as special cases and the Bernoulli distribution as a limiting case.

Background 
The CMP distribution was originally proposed by Conway and Maxwell in 1962  as a solution to handling queueing systems with state-dependent service rates.  The CMP distribution was introduced into the statistics literature by Boatwright et al. 2003  and Shmueli et al. (2005).  The first detailed investigation into the
probabilistic and statistical properties of the distribution was published by Shmueli et al. (2005). Some theoretical probability results of COM-Poisson distribution is studied and reviewed by Li et al. (2019), especially the characterizations of COM-Poisson distribution.

Probability mass function and basic properties 
The CMP distribution is defined to be the distribution with probability mass function

where :

The function  serves as a normalization constant so the probability mass function sums to one. Note that  does not have a closed form.

The additional parameter  which does not appear in the Poisson distribution allows for adjustment of the rate of decay. This rate of decay is a non-linear decrease in ratios of successive probabilities, specifically

When  the CMP distribution reduces to a geometric distribution with probability of success  provided .

For the CMP distribution, moments can be found through the recursive formula

Cumulative distribution function 

If  is an integer, we can, however, obtain the following formula in terms of the generalized hypergeometric function:

The normalizing constant 

Many important summary statistics, such as moments and cumulants, of the CMP distribution can be expressed in terms of the normalizing constant .

The cumulant generating function is

and the cumulants are given by

Whilst the normalizing constant  does not in general have a closed form, there are some noteworthy special cases:

 
 
 
 , where  is a modified Bessel function of the first kind.
 For integer , the normalizing constant can expressed  as a generalized hypergeometric function: .

Because the normalizing constant does not in general have a closed form, the following asymptotic expansion is of interest. Fix .

In particular, .  Further coefficients are given in.

Moments, cumulants and related results 

We do, however, have the following neat formula. Let  denote the falling factorial. Let , . Then

Since in general closed form formulas are not available for moments and cumulants of the CMP distribution, the following asymptotic formulas are of interest. Let , where . Denote the skewness  and excess kurtosis , where .

where

Moments for the case of integer  

When  is an integer explicit formulas for moments can be obtained.  The case  corresponds to the Poisson distribution.  Suppose now that .  For ,

where  is the modified Bessel function of the first kind.

Using the connecting formula for moments and factorial moments gives

Also, since , the variance is given by

Suppose now that  is an integer.  Then 

In particular,

 

and

Median, mode and mean deviation 

Let .

The mean deviation of  about its mean  is given by 

Then

Stein characterisation 

Then

Conversely, suppose now that  is a real-valued random variable supported on  such that  for all bounded .  Then .

Use as a limiting distribution 

This result generalises the classical Poisson approximation of the binomial distribution. More generally, the CMP distribution arises as a limiting distribution of Conway–Maxwell–Poisson binomial distribution. Apart from the fact that COM-binomial approximates to COM-Poisson, Zhang et al. (2018) illustrates that COM-negative binomial distribution with probability mass function

Related distributions 

 , then  follows the Poisson distribution with parameter .
 Suppose .  Then if , we have that  follows the geometric distribution with probability mass function , .

Parameter estimation 

There are a few methods of estimating the parameters of the CMP distribution from the data. Two methods will be discussed: weighted least squares and maximum likelihood. The weighted least squares approach is simple and efficient but lacks precision. Maximum likelihood, on the other hand, is precise, but is more complex and computationally intensive.

Weighted least squares 

The weighted least squares provides a simple, efficient method to derive rough estimates of the parameters of the CMP distribution and determine if the distribution would be an appropriate model. Following the use of this method, an alternative method should be employed to compute more accurate estimates of the parameters if the model is deemed appropriate.

This method uses the relationship of successive probabilities as discussed above. By taking logarithms of both sides of this equation, the following linear relationship arises

where  denotes . To determine if the CMP distribution is an appropriate model, these values should be plotted against  for all ratios without zero counts. If the data appear to be linear, then the model is likely to be a good fit.

However, the basic assumption of homoscedasticity is violated, so a weighted least squares regression must be used. The inverse weight matrix will have the variances of each ratio on the diagonal with the one-step covariances on the first off-diagonal, both given below.

Maximum likelihood 

The CMP likelihood function is

Maximizing the likelihood yields the following two equations

which do not have an analytic solution.

Instead, the maximum likelihood estimates are approximated numerically by the Newton–Raphson method.

Generalized linear model 

The basic CMP distribution discussed above has also been used as the basis for a generalized linear model (GLM) using a Bayesian formulation. A dual-link GLM based on the CMP distribution has been developed,
and this model has been used to evaluate traffic accident data. A full Bayesian estimation approach has been used with MCMC sampling implemented in WinBugs with non-informative priors for the regression parameters. This approach is computationally expensive, but it yields the full posterior distributions for the regression parameters and allows expert knowledge to be incorporated through the use of informative priors.

A classical GLM formulation for a CMP regression has been developed which generalizes Poisson regression and logistic regression. This takes advantage of the exponential family properties of the CMP distribution to obtain elegant model estimation (via maximum likelihood), inference, diagnostics, and interpretation. This approach requires substantially less computational time than the Bayesian approach, at the cost of not allowing expert knowledge to be incorporated into the model. In addition it yields standard errors for the regression parameters (via the Fisher Information matrix) compared to the full posterior distributions obtainable via the Bayesian formulation. It also provides a statistical test for the level of dispersion compared to a Poisson model. Code for fitting a CMP regression, testing for dispersion, and evaluating fit is available.

The two GLM frameworks developed for the CMP distribution significantly extend the usefulness of this distribution for data analysis problems.

References

External links 
 Conway–Maxwell–Poisson distribution package for R (compoisson) by Jeffrey Dunn, part of Comprehensive R Archive Network (CRAN)
 Conway–Maxwell–Poisson distribution package for R (compoisson) by Tom Minka, third party package

Discrete distributions
Poisson distribution